Arakamchechen Island (Eskimo–Aleut: Kigini) is an island in the Bering Sea.

Geography
Arakamchechen lies north of Cape Chaplino, close to the coast of Chukotka. It is separated from the continental shore by an 8 km wide sound. This island is inhabited; the main settlement is Yanrakynnot village.

Arakamchechen Island is 32 km long and has a maximum width of 21 km. It has a mountainous interior. South of it lies Yttygran Island and west of it Penkigney Bay. There is a 5 km wide sound between the two islands.

Administration
Administratively Arakamchechen Island belongs to the Chukotka Autonomous Okrug of the Russian Federation.

Nowadays this island is popular with tourists who come to enjoy the wildlife. Many walruses live in rookeries in the shores of this island.

References

External links
Pictures of walrus hunters in Arakamchechen Island

Islands of Chukotka Autonomous Okrug
Islands of the Bering Sea
Providensky District